The NAIA Road (Ninoy Aquino International Airport Road), formerly known and still commonly referred to as the MIA Road (Manila International Airport Road), is a short 8-10 lane divided highway connecting Roxas Boulevard and the Manila–Cavite Expressway (R-1) with Ninoy Aquino International Airport (NAIA) in southwestern Metro Manila, Philippines. It is also a major local road that links the cities of Pasay and Parañaque running approximately  underneath the elevated NAIA Expressway from R-1 in Tambo, Parañaque to NAIA Terminal 2 in Pasay. En route, it intersects, from west to east, Quirino Avenue, Domestic Road, and Ninoy Aquino Avenue. The road ends at the entrance of NAIA Terminal 2.

The road also houses a small strip of shops across from Coastal Mall, Tambo Elementary School at Quirino Avenue, Park 'N Fly at Domestic Road, and the old Nayong Pilipino close to Terminal 2. The old NAIA Terminal 1 is accessible by turning south at Ninoy Aquino Avenue, which also leads to the Duty Free FiestaMall and continues on to Sucat as Dr. Santos Avenue. The new Terminal 3, on the other hand, is located on Andrews Avenue which can be accessed from Domestic Road. The road was originally named as MIA Road and was only renamed in 1987 when Manila's international airport became Ninoy Aquino International, in honor of the late Senator Ninoy Aquino.

The NAIA Expressway runs through the NAIA Road from the Sales Interchange of the Skyway to the junction of the NAIA Road and Macapagal Boulevard via Andrews Avenue and Electrical Road, providing better access to all four terminals of Ninoy Aquino International Airport, as well as the casino complex in Entertainment City.

References

Streets in Metro Manila